Hernando County is  a county located on the west central coast of the U.S. state of Florida. As of the 2020 census, the population was 194,515. Its county seat is Brooksville, and its largest community is Spring Hill.

Hernando County is included in the Tampa-St. Petersburg-Clearwater, FL Metropolitan Statistical Area. As of 2005, Hernando was the 35th fastest-growing county in the country.

History

Around 1840, Fort DeSoto was established in present-day Hernando County in the northeast edge of present-day Brooksville to protect settlers in the area from Native Americans. Fort DeSoto became a small community center, trading post, and way station on the route to Tampa. Settlements started to grow near the fort beginning around 1845; two towns developed, Melendez and Pierceville, which would later merge to create Brooksville in 1856.

Then encompassing a significantly larger area of west central Florida than it does today, Hernando County was officially established on February 27, 1843, two years prior to Florida's admission into the Union. It was created from portions of Alachua, Hillsborough and Orange Counties and included all of present-day Citrus and Pasco Counties. Named for Spanish explorer Hernando de Soto, whose name has also been honored in DeSoto County, Hernando County was briefly renamed Benton County in 1844 for Missouri Senator Thomas Hart Benton, a strong supporter of territorial expansion who aided in the county's creation. However, Benton fell out of favor with the county's residents later in the decade due to his decision to support the Missouri Compromise and the overall reversal of his stance on slavery, and the county's name reverted in 1850.

In December 1854, the legislature designated the small port town of Bayport the county seat. Residents living in the eastern section of the county instead desired a more central place for the county government, and by 1855, voters had selected an inland site within five miles (8 km) of the center of the county at the town of Melendez. In 1856, the citizens of Hernando County chose to rename the town, their new County Seat, Brooksville in honor of South Carolina Representative Preston Brooks, who in the same year beat fierce abolitionist Massachusetts Senator Charles Sumner with a cane in the Senate chambers, winning the Congressman great renown in the South.

In 1855, town founder Joseph Hale donated land for a county courthouse in the center of present-day Brooksville. Soon thereafter, the structure was completed.

During the Civil War, Hernando County primarily contributed foodstuffs, cotton, and lumber to the Confederacy. Although Union ships imposed a blockade on the port of Bayport, runners enjoyed a great deal of success—enough to lead the Union in June 1864 to order some 150–250 troops to destroy Confederate stockpiles in the county. In early July, the expedition marched northward from Anclote River to Brooksville, meeting some resistance from assembled Confederate troops hastily organized to protect the city. The Federal troops won this engagement (known locally as the Brooksville Raid and marched to Bayport, where they and an auxiliary force landing from gunboats sacked Rebel operations. The skirmish between Union raiders and local Confederates is reenacted annually in the county. 

At least one unit that fought in the Civil War was mustered in Hernando County. The Hernando County "Wildcats," formed Company C of 3rd Florida Infantry Regiment. The unit was captained by Walter Terry Saxon who was reportedly well liked by his men. He was paid roughly $20,000 for work surveying the Everglades. He used most of this money to arm and equip the Wildcats.

Arthur St. Clair, a minister, was lynched in Hernando County, Florida, in 1877 for performing the wedding of a black man and white woman.

The county courthouse was destroyed by a fire on September 29, 1877. On June 2, 1887, the Florida State Legislature divided Hernando County into three independent counties: Pasco County to the south, Citrus County to the north, and Hernando County in the middle. Since then, Hernando County's borders have remained unchanged.

Geography
According to the World Atlas USA, Hernando County is the geographic center of Florida. Elevation in the county ranges from mean sea level along the Gulf coast to its highest natural point of 269 feet at Chinsegut Hill.

Adjacent counties
 Citrus County, Florida - north
 Sumter County, Florida - east
 Pasco County, Florida - south

National protected area
 Chassahowitzka National Wildlife Refuge

State protected areas
Weeki Wachee Springs

Withlacoochee State Forest

Other points of interest
 Croom Motorcycle Park
 Bayport Park
 Brooksville Railroad Depot Museum
 Delta Woods Park
 Weeki Wachee Preserve
 Veterans Memorial Park
 Tom Varn Park
 Annutteliga Hammock

Demographics

As of the 2020 United States census, there were 194,515 people, 76,708 households, and 51,765 families residing in the county.

As of the census of 2000, there were 130,802 people, 55,425 households, and 40,016 families residing in the county.  The population density was 106/sq mi (274/km2).  There were 62,727 housing units at an average density of 51/sq mi (131/km2).  The racial makeup of the county was 92.85% White, 4.07% Black or African American, 0.30% Native American, 0.64% Asian, 0.02% Pacific Islander, 0.98% from other races, and 1.13% from two or more races.  5.04% of the population was Hispanic or Latino of any race. 91.1% spoke English, 4.5% Spanish, 1.1% German and 1.1% Italian as their first language.

There were 55,425 households, which 21.80% had children under the age of 18 living with them, 60.40% were married couples living together, 8.70% had a female householder with no husband present, and 27.80% were non-families. 23.30% of all households were made up of individuals, and 14.70% had someone living alone who was 65 years of age or older.  The average household size was 2.32 and the average family size was 2.70.

In the county 18.90% of the population was under the age of 18, 5.40% was between the ages of 18 to 24, 20.40% between  25 to 44, 24.40% between 45 and 64, and 30.90% were 65 years of age or older.  The median age was 50 years. For every 100 females there were 90.50 males.  For every 100 females, age 18 and over, there were 87.50 males.

The median income for a household in the county was $32,572, and the median income for a family was $37,509. Males had a median income of $30,295 versus $21,661 for females. The per capita income for the county was $18,321.  About 7.10% of families and 10.30% of the population were below the poverty line, including 15.90% of those under age 18 and 6.20% of those ages 65 or over.

Economy
The industrial park Airport Industrial Park is a  located near the Hernando County Airport. Over one hundred aviation, manufacturing and distribution businesses are located in this area.
 Hernando County Office of Business Development

Top employers
The top employers of Hernando County are as follows:
1. Hernando County School Board (3,002)
2. Walmart (1,350)
3. Hernando County Government
4. Oak Hill Hospital (1,561)
5. Publix (1,050)
6. Walmart Hernando Distribution center (1,020)

Transportation

Airports
 Brooksville–Tampa Bay Regional Airport (ICAO: KBKV, FAA LID: BKV) serves southeastern Spring Hill, northern Masaryktown, and Garden Grove.

Mass transit
Hernando THE Bus provides bus service in Brooksville and Spring Hill.

Railroads
CSX operates two rail lines within the county. Amtrak formerly provided passenger rail service along the old Atlantic Coast Line Railroad line east of US 301 in Ridge Manor, but had no stops in the county, the nearest stops being Dade City, and its last train on the line, the Palmetto had its Florida service discontinued in late 2004. The other line is the Brooksville Subdivision, which runs close to US 41, and was previously owned by the Seaboard Air Line. The last train directly serving the county, in Croom, was local Jacksonville - St. Petersburg service in 1955 or 1956 operated by the Atlantic Coast Line Railroad.

Notable abandoned railroad lines include a former branch of the Atlantic Coast Line Railroad spanning from southeast of Ridge Manor through Istachatta that became part of the Withlacoochee State Trail, and a spur of this line from Croom west into Brooksville, part of which is being replaced by a new rail trail called the Good Neighbor Trail. Though originally the Good Neighbor Trail only existed within Brooksville itself, the extension to the Withlacoohee State Trail has existed since 2018.

Major highways

  US 19 (Commercial Way) is a major commercial highway running parallel to the Gulf of Mexico on the western edge of the county, and used as a primary connecting route to cities on the west coast of Florida, including Hudson, New Port Richey, Tarpon Springs, Clearwater, and St. Petersburg, as well as Homosassa and Crystal River to the north.
  US 41 (Broad Street) runs parallel to US 19 through points in the center of the county, including downtown Brooksville, where it intersects with SR 50 and US 98. It is still a primary connecting route with Tampa. Between Brooksville and Garden Grove, US 41 is a six-lane highway, and between Garden Grove and Masaryktown it is a four-lane highway. To the northeast, US 41 runs through part of the Withlacoochee State Forest. Plans are currently under way to widen US 41 throughout Hernando County.
  US 98 (Ponce de Leon Boulevard) runs diagonally across the county from the northwest to the southeast, where it exits into Pasco County, and runs concurrent with SR 50 in the eastern part of the county, intersects I-75 in Ridge Manor West and meets the Suncoast Parkway at the parkway's current end near World Woods Golf Course north of Brooksville.
  US 301 (Treiman Boulevard) is a north–south highway that crosses into the county briefly at its tapered eastern end, running parallel to I-75, and intersecting with SR 50 at Ridge Manor.
  Interstate 75 runs north and south across the eastern part of the county, with one exit (Exit 301) at its intersection with US 98/SR 50. Once a major connecting point with Tampa, I-75 has been made obsolete for western residents of the county by the Suncoast Parkway.
  Suncoast Parkway (SR 589) enters the county in the south slightly to the west of US 41, and ends in the far northern part of the county at US 98. (N.B. the Suncoast Parkway is considered incomplete; there are plans for it to extend through northern Hernando County and through adjacent Citrus County and head into Crystal River.) The Suncoast Parkway is a toll road that connects Hernando County with Hillsborough County, where it becomes the Veterans Expressway and heads directly into Tampa International Airport before reaching Interstate 275. SR 589 has four Hernando County exits: County Line Road (Exit 37), Spring Hill Drive (Exit 41), SR 50 (Exit 46), and US 98 (Future Exit 54).
  SR 50 (Cortez Boulevard) begins at US 19 in Weeki Wachee, runs through Brooksville, and exits into Sumter County at the eastern tip of the county. Along the way, it interchanges with the Suncoast Parkway, intersects with US 41 in Brooksville, runs concurrently with US 98, and intersects with I-75 in Ridge Manor West(Hernando County's only interchange with I-75) and US 301 in Ridge Manor. A significant, well-developed highway in the county, SR 50 originally extended from US 19 to the Gulf Coast at Bayport. This section was given back to the county and is currently CR 550. Currently, S.R. 50 is used as a beeline route from the county to Orlando in the east.
  SR 50 Alternate (Jefferson Street) is a spur of SR 50 that runs through downtown Brooksville, running concurrently with both US 41 and US 98 at points.
  Spring Hill Drive (CR 574) is a major county road running roughly parallel to both SR 50 and the border with Pasco County beginning by US 19, intersects the Suncoast Parkway, and ends at US 41.
  County Line Road (CR 578) is a major county road running entirely along the border with Pasco County beginning at US 19, intersects the Suncoast Parkway, and ends at US 41. Due to increased congestion, it is planned to be upgraded from two to four lanes, and possibly upgraded from a county road to a state road.

Politics
Hernando County has been trending towards the Republican party in the 21st century.

Presidential Elections

Local Government

Board of County Commissioners 
Hernando County's chief legislative body is the Board of County Commissioners. The county is divided into five Districts, each with their own commissioner. Commissioners are elected by the voters at large, to four-year terms. Specific duties of the county Commissioners are outlined in Chapter 125, Florida Statutes.

District 1

District 2

District 3

District 4

District 5

Constitutional Officers

Clerk of Court and Comptroller

Supervisor Of Elections

Property Appraiser

Sheriff

Emergency Management

Fire Departments
 Brooksville Fire Department
 Hernando County Fire Rescue  https://www.hernandocounty.us/departments/departments-f-m/fire-rescue-1652
 Hernando Beach Volunteer Fire Department (De-Commissioned 2/15/17)
The Hernando Beach Volunteer Fire Department was decommissioned on 2/15/17 and taken over by the Hernando County Fire Department.

Law Enforcement Agencies
 (Defunct) Brooksville Police Department (Disbanded 6/1/18)
 Hernando County Sheriff's Office
 Florida Department of Law Enforcement
 FWC Division of Law Enforcement (State Game Wardens)
 Florida Highway Patrol

Hospitals
 Brooksville Regional Hospital
 HealthSouth Rehabilitation Hospital of Spring Hill
 Oak Hill Hospital
 Spring Hill Regional Hospital
 Springbrook Hospital

Library
The county is served by the Hernando County Library System. This is a public library system with one central library located in Brooksville and three other branches in Brooksville and Spring Hill. There are no bookmobiles associated with this library system. As of 2013, the staff totaled 42 people, including 11 librarians and 31 other staff members, only ten of which were full-time employees. The Florida Library Association chose the Hernando system as its 2013 Library of the Year. This library system serves a legal population of 136,484 people. The annual number of library visits is 480,706. There are 49 Internet terminals for use by the general public. The annual service hours for all service outlets is 12,215.

The library system has four branches:
 Main Library/Brooksville Branch
 East Hernando Branch
 West Hernando Branch
 Spring Hill Branch

Communities

Cities
 Brooksville

Census-designated places

 Aripeka
 Bayport
 Brookridge
 Garden Grove
 Hernando Beach
 High Point
 Hill 'n Dale
 Istachatta
 Lake Lindsey
 Masaryktown
 Nobleton
 North Brooksville
 North Weeki Wachee
 Pine Island
 Ridge Manor
 South Brooksville
 Spring Hill
 Spring Lake
 Timber Pines
 Weeki Wachee Gardens
 Wiscon

Other unincorporated communities
 Croom
 Rolling Acres
 Royal Highlands
 Weeki Wachee

See also
 National Register of Historic Places listings in Hernando County, Florida

Notes

References

External links

 Tourism Website
 

 
Florida counties
1843 establishments in Florida Territory
Populated places established in 1843
Counties in the Tampa Bay area